Steven Kuehl (born 1957) is an American professor of marine geology who graduated from Lafayette College in 1979 with a BSc degree; he earned his master's degree from North Carolina State University in 1982, followed by a Ph.D. from the same place three years later. The majority of his works are published in Geology journal but some is published elsewhere.

References

Living people
1957 births
Lafayette College alumni
North Carolina State University alumni
Marine geologists